Peter Gornstein is a Danish filmmaker.

He has directed feature films, television episodes, video games and commercials as well as written several screenplays and teleplays. He has also worked in various technical roles in film production as well as AAA game productions, even earning recognition at SIGGRAPH 2014. 

Director, Screenwriter and Cinematic Director with more that 20 years of experience in the television, movies and the AAA gaming industry.

His 2007 film Sunrise won three awards, the Fuji Film International Short Film Award, the Panavision Award and an award from FotoKem. 

Peter started as a concept artist working for IMAGEWORKS and later IOI Interactive. He has worked on numerous AAA games as Global Cinematic Director, Art Director and main-writer. Among others, FREEDOM FIGTHERS, KANE & LYNCH the HITMAN series, AVATAR, and RYSE – Son of Rome, which earned Peter a VES win as well as several other nominations, BFTA being one of them. Venturing into live action television he has been nominated at the CANNES FILM FESTIVAL as Best Young Director for his commercial DRIVE SAFE. His New Danish Screen film PEACEFORCE won the Prix Canal+ at the CLERMONT FERRAND FILM FESTIVAL and was shortlisted at the OSCARS as well as being nominated Robert (the danish film academy award) and several other international film Festivals. Later Peter directed MENS VI PRESSER CITRONEN, which became the most seen series in Denmark of 2015 for Danish National television DR1.
He then worked as the show runner and main writer and directed THEO AND THE MAGIC TALISMAN a 24 episode series for Danish National television DR1. And was nominated for a Robert and the series became the most seen series in Denmark of 2018. From 2019 to 2022 Peter worked as the Cinematic Director and caster for the new AAA AVATAR video game (Current release date 2024) as well working as a writer on projects for NETFLIX among others. Currently working as the cinematic director at Sharkmob.

References

Danish film directors
Year of birth missing (living people)
Living people